David and Goliath is a 1960 Italian film directed by Ferdinando Baldi and Richard Pottier with sequences filmed in Israel and Yugoslavia.

Plot 
The Prophet Samuel foretells a new king will rule Israel to the dismay of King Saul and his cousin and commander in chief Abner. King Saul has been having a streak of bad luck since the Philistine captivity of the Ark and fears the newcomer but doesn't know who the new king will be.

The unsuspecting shepherd David visits Jerusalem where he is identified as the king. Abner decides to test his wisdom by asking how the Israelites can get around the Philistines' imposed edict that the only ones who may lawfully bear arms in defeated Israel are the officers of Saul's court and his palace guard. David replies that the Philistines have set no limit on the number of officers or palace guards.

Meanwhile, King Asrod of the Philistines plots another attack on the riches of Israel, this time accompanied by the fearsome giant Goliath.

Cast 
Orson Welles as King Saul
Ivica Pajer as David.  Credited as Ivo Payer in the movie.
Hilton Edwards as Prophet Samuel
Massimo Serato as Abner
Eleonora Rossi Drago as Merab
Giulia Rubini as Michal
Pierre Cressoy as Jonathan
Furio Meniconi as Asrod, King of the Philistines
 Aldo Pedinotti credited as "Kronos" as Goliath
Dante Maggio as Cret
Luigi Tosi as Benjamin of Gaba
Umberto Fiz as Lazar
Ugo Sasso as Huro

Production
A part of the production took place in Jerusalem, another in Yugoslavia.

Comic book adaptation
 Dell Four Color #1205 (July 1961)

References

Bibliography

External links 

1960 films
1960s adventure drama films
Films set in the 11th century BC
English-language Italian films
1960s Italian-language films
Films directed by Richard Pottier
Films about David
Films set in Jerusalem
Films shot in Israel
Films shot in Yugoslavia
Peplum films
Films directed by Ferdinando Baldi
Religious epic films
Films adapted into comics
Sword and sandal films
1960 drama films
1960s Italian films